The Antwerp Tower is a skyscraper in Antwerp (Belgium).

History
Since 1900, the site had been the location of the "Grand Hotel Weber", a Belle Époque style luxury hotel, which was severely damaged by bombings in World War II and stood empty for almost 20 years until it was demolished in the late 1960s. Despite counting prominent companies among its renters, such as  Yellow Pages and Unilever, the office building never became popular and renting out offices became increasingly difficult. In 2012 the building was sold to Wilma Project Development, a part of the Matexi Group, who intended to convert the tower to residential units after an extensive renovation.
Before the renovation, the Antwerp Tower was often considered to be one of the ugliest buildings in Europe, both due to its out of place location and its copper colored facade.

Renovation
Wilma Project Development, a part of the Matexi Group, purchased the building in 2012 for 25 million Euros. The renovation started in 2017 and was finished in 2021. The building was transformed from an office building to a mainly residential tower, with only limited commercial and office space on the lower levels. The building was gut renovated, the dimensions were altered by adding two double height floors on top and widening the floors on all levels. The finished tower has a total of 241 residential units.

Commercial and office spaces
Restaurants Hawaiian Poké Bowl and Pitaya occupy the commercial spaces on the ground floor, consumer electronics retailer Media Markt occupies the first floor.
Real estate investor Befimmo purchased the three office floors which will become a Silversquare coworking location starting in 2022.

References 

Buildings and structures in Antwerp
Office buildings completed in 1974
1974 establishments in Belgium
Residential buildings completed in 2021